Micah 6 is the sixth chapter of the Book of Micah in the Hebrew Bible or the Old Testament of the Christian Bible. This book contains the prophecies attributed to the prophet Micah, and is a part of the Book of the Twelve Minor Prophets.

Text 
The original text was written in the Hebrew language. This chapter is divided into 16 verses.

Textual versions
Some early manuscripts containing the text of this chapter in Hebrew are of the Masoretic Text, which includes the Codex Cairensis (895), the Petersburg Codex of the Prophets (916), Aleppo Codex (10th century), Codex Leningradensis (1008). Fragments containing parts of this chapter were found among the Dead Sea Scrolls, that is, the fragments from Wadi Murabba'at Minor Prophets (Mur88; MurXIIProph; 75-100 CE) with extant verses 1–7, 11–16.

There is also a translation into Koine Greek known as the Septuagint, made in the last few centuries BCE. Extant ancient manuscripts of the Septuagint version include Codex Vaticanus (B; B; 4th century), Codex Alexandrinus (A; A; 5th century) and Codex Marchalianus (Q; Q; 6th century).

Verse 5
  O my people, remember now what Balak king of Moab consulted,
 and what Balaam the son of Beor answered him
 from Shittim unto Gilgal;
 that ye may know the righteousness of the Lord.
 The Lord reminds the people of another great benefit subsequent to the Exodus, viz. the defeat of the designs of Balak, and the sorceries of Balaam.
 "Balaam the son of Beor": God did not only raise up Moses, Aaron, Miriam, out of their brethren, but He turned the curse of the alien Balaam into a blessing; and that, not for their righteousness, (for even then they were rebellious,) out of His own truth and righteousness. Not that the curse of Balaam could in itself have hurt them; but, in proportion to his reputation, it would have infused great energy into their enemies: and its reversal must have struck a great panic into them and into others. Even after they had seduced Israel, through Balaam's devilish counsel, Midian seemed to have been stricken by God with panic, and not to have struck a blow (Numbers 31:49).
 "Answered him": The answer of Balaam was the blessing which he was constrained to give, instead of the curse which he was hired to pronounce (compare ). Grotius explains it, "how Balaam answered, that the only way to injure thee was by tempting thee to idolatry and whoredom".
 "From Shittim unto Gilgal": The words are separated by the Hebrew accent from what went before. This is a fresh consideration, referring to mercies under Joshua, and may be made plainer by inserting "remember" (which has, perhaps, dropped out of the text), as in the Revised Version. Shittim was the Israelites' last station before crossing the Jordan, and Gilgal the first in the land of Canaan; and so God bids them remember all that happened to them between those places - their sin in Shittim ("Baal-peor") and the mercy then shown them (Numbers 25), the miraculous passage of the Jordan, the renewal of the covenant at Gilgal. Shittim; the acacia meadow (Abel-Shittim), hod. Ghor-es-Seisaban, was at the southeastern corner of the Ciccar, or Plain of Jordan, some seven miles from the Dead Sea. Gilgal (see note on ).
 "That ye may know the righteousness (righteous acts) of the Lord": All these instances of God's interposition prove how faithful he is to his promises, how he cares for his elect, what are his gracious counsels towards them (see the same expression, Judges 5:11; 1 Samuel 12:7).

Verse 8
  He hath shewed thee, O man, what is good;
 and what doth the Lord require of thee,
 but to do justly, 
 and to love mercy,
 and to walk humbly with thy God?
 "He hath showed thee"; literally, "one has told thee", or, "it has been told thee", referring to the words Moses in the Torah (etc.).
 "to do justly": or "judgment"; that is, to exercise public judgment and justice, to give to everyone their due, according to the law of God.
 "to love mercy": "being merciful, out of love" (cf."not of necessity, for God loveth a cheerful giver" ) in correspondence to the mercy and justice of God.
 "to walk humbly with thy God": referring to 'passive and active obedience towards God', implying constant prayer and "humble" converse with God.

See also

Related Bible parts: Numbers 22–24, Joshua 3–4, Isaiah 1, Matthew 7, James 4, 1 Peter 5

Notes

References

Sources

External links

Jewish
Micah 6 Hebrew with Parallel English
Micah 6 Hebrew with Rashi's Commentary

Christian
Micah 6 English Translation with Parallel Latin Vulgate

06